Houba! On the Trail of the Marsupilami (original title: Sur la piste du Marsupilami) is a 2012 Franco-Belgian CGI animated/live-action comedy film co-written and directed by Alain Chabat. It is based on the comics series Marsupilami created by André Franquin.

Plot
Dan Geraldo, a reporter who needs a scoop, arrives in Chiquito, Palombia, but he does not think that he is going to discover anything significant, other than an interview with the Paya; the indigenous tribes of Palombia. However, accompanied by the eccentric and poor vet and tour guide, Pablito, whose children dislike him and deem him a liar, Dan is told the myth of the Marsupilami, a mythical and extremely rare creature that is believed to inhabit the Palombian rainforest and to be a real species.

Meanwhile, 80-year-old botanist Hermoso discovers a beautiful but rare orchid, in which the Marsupilami uses to cradle its eggs, manages to condense it into a liquid and drinks it, turning him to an early adult age. With the help of Caporal, a Palombian Army officer, he performs a coup d'état and imprisons General Pochero, the current dictator with a love for Celine Dion, while he plans to capture the Marsupilami, which had earlier stolen Hermoso's samples and is planned to be trained to take more orchids for Hermoso to stay young.

Dan and Pablito, after tracking in the jungle, are captured by the Paya. In their temple, they meet the beautiful Queen Paya, who gives a prophecy of the Marsupilami (seen as the Guardian of the Jungle) being threatened by "the man with two faces". They are released, but after Dan insults Pablito and reveals that he isn't paying him, the two get into an argument and separate.

Pablito soon meets the Marsupilami and discovers that it had a mate and a nest of eggs. Suddenly, the nest is torn down by the Palombian soldiers and the Marsupilami is struck by a tranquilizer dart by Caporal. Hermoso, who has given himself the title General, finds more orchids, but also discovers the eggs. Pablito tries to stop them, but Dan bumps into him and they are both knocked out. He places both in an incubator at his presidential palace and gives the Marsupilami to Caporal, seeing no use for it anymore.

Back in prison, the two find General Pochero, who manages to give in and escapes using a secret exit, arriving at the palace. Because Pochero enjoys hearing Celine Dion's "I'm Alive", he disguises himself as a woman, using the costumes of his mannequins, and distracts the Palombian soldiers, giving Pablito and Dan the chance to steal the orchids, eggs and a limousine before returning to Chiquito. Caporal is knocked out by the Marsupilami and it escapes after the eggs. Hermoso discovers that the orchids and eggs were stolen, and furiously takes off in a military jeep after the trio.

Dan makes it to TV Palombia, and begins the show by explaining the Marsupilami's existence. Pablito comes to his aid, after his video tape is missing, but realizes that he had accidentally erased the video; the Marsupilami arrives to take its eggs, revealing itself on TV. Suddenly, Hermoso runs through the room with the jeep and nearly kills the Marsupilami for its eggs, but the potion wears off and Hermoso shifts to an infant after drinking too much serum to regain his youth. Pablito is forgiven by his children, and the Marsupilami is securely returned to its home in the jungle, with the now-hatched babies with its new parents.

Cast
 Jamel Debbouze as Pablito Camaron, the eccentric vet/tour guide
 Alain Chabat as Dan Geraldo, a reporter
 Frédéric Testot as young and old Hermoso, a botanist and the antagonist 
 Géraldine Nakache as Pétunia, Hermoso's assistant
 Lambert Wilson as General Pochero, president of Palombia
 Patrick Timsit as Caporal, the sadistic Palombian major-colonel
 Liya Kebede as Queen Paya
 The Great Khali as Bolo/"Petite Voix" 
 Aïssa Maïga as Clarisse Iris, the announcer of TV Palombia
 Jacques Weber as Papa Dan, Dan Geraldo's father
 Chantal Lauby as The Voice
 Gerardo Taracena as Mateo
 Celine Dion as Herself
 Salah Benlemqawanssa as Performer Paya

Production
Filming began on 20 September 2010 in Belgium and in Mexico.

Reception
The film sold 251,265 tickets during its first run in France. It eventually topped the box-office with 5,303,302 tickets.

Other countries
Results on 2 August 2012:
 Belgium: 248,000 spectators
 Switzerland: 115,000 spectators
 Russia: 96,000 spectators

References

External links
  
 
 Sur la Piste du Marsupilami on Big Cartoon DataBase

2010s children's fantasy films
Films with live action and animation
2010s fantasy comedy films
2012 films
French children's films
Films based on Belgian comics
Live-action films based on comics
2010s adventure comedy films
IMAX films
Films set in South America
Films directed by Alain Chabat
2012 comedy films
Films scored by Bruno Coulais
Marsupilami
2010s French films